Mónika Járomi (born 6 January 1973) is a retired Hungarian Paralympic swimmer. At the 1996 Summer Paralympics in Atlanta, she won two medals, including one gold. In addition, she is also a two-time World Champion.

References

1973 births
Living people
Sportspeople from Debrecen
Paralympic swimmers of Hungary
Swimmers at the 1992 Summer Paralympics
Swimmers at the 1996 Summer Paralympics
Medalists at the 1996 Summer Paralympics
Paralympic medalists in swimming
Paralympic gold medalists for Hungary
Paralympic silver medalists for Hungary
Hungarian female medley swimmers
Hungarian female butterfly swimmers
S5-classified Paralympic swimmers